Black Light or Blacklight, in comics, may refer to:

Black Light (2000 AD), a series in British science fiction comic 2000AD
Blacklight (Image Comics), two Image Comics characters
Blacklight (MC2), a Marvel Comics character

See also
Black Light (disambiguation)
Kai-ro, for a Batman Beyond character
Black Lightning